A sheath current is a form of charge transfer in wires. Sheath currents can run along the outer sheath of a coaxial cable. This can be caused by a geographically proximate or remote ground potential. 

Sheath currents may lower the efficiency of transmission and can interfere with nearby electronic devices. In addition, sheath currents caused by differences in ground potential at the ends of a coaxial cable to common mode signals that are superimposed on the useful signal as a noise voltage. Sheath currents can be caused by ground loops.

Countermeasures against sheath currents

High-frequency signal lines may attenuate or prevent sheath currents using a sheath current filter which is applied to a coaxial cable in or near the device. In the simplest case, this is a ferrite bead, it includes the coaxial inner and outer conductor and acts as a common-mode choke. At the same time, a ferrite bead has a transformer effect, so that a useful signal is confirmed as differential-mode. To increase the inductance compared to the unwanted common mode signal component, the cable can also be repeatedly passed through or wound around the bead.

In addition, higher frequency signals are often used with a capacitive coupling filter. More information is available in the article sheath current filter. 

With a balun, sheath currents can be avoided when a balanced line is connected to an unbalanced line. Without the use of baluns, sheath currents will occur on the unbalanced line. A use for this is the combination of a symmetric dipole antenna with a coaxial line.

References

Electric current
Electromagnetic compatibility
ta:உறை மின்சாரம்